The Binny Mills strike of 1926 was a general strike in 1926 in the Bangalore Woollen, Cotton and Silk Mills, which was popularly known as Binny Mills in Bangalore. The strike is considered to be a part of the Indian independence movement.

The strike was caused by the 1925 decision government of Mysore State to amend the 1914 Factory Act, which had recommended the reduction of working hours, increased wages and better working conditions. That caused unrest among the factory workers.

References

1926 labor disputes and strikes
1926 in India
History of Bangalore
Textile and clothing strikes
Labour disputes in India
Silk production
Events in Bangalore